Black rattlesnake may refer to:

 Crotalus horridus, the timber rattlesnake, a venomous pitviper species found in the eastern United States.
 Crotalus o. oreganus, the western rattlesnake, a venomous pitviper subspecies found in North America from the Pacific slope in British Columbia, Canada, south through the United States to San Luis Obispo and Kern counties in California.
 Crotalus cerberus, the Arizona black rattlesnake, a venomous pitviper subspecies found in the southwestern United States.